Toni Salame (born 11 July 1963) is a Lebanese alpine skier. He competed in two events at the 1988 Winter Olympics.

References

1963 births
Living people
Lebanese male alpine skiers
Olympic alpine skiers of Lebanon
Alpine skiers at the 1988 Winter Olympics
Place of birth missing (living people)